The Samsung Galaxy Core Advance is an Android smartphone designed, developed, and marketed by Samsung Electronics. Announced on 16 December 2013, the Galaxy Core Advance features a  diagonal TFT display with 800x400 resolution and Android Jelly Bean 4.2.  The phone was scheduled to be released in 2014.

References

Android (operating system) devices
Mobile phones introduced in 2013
Samsung mobile phones
Samsung Galaxy
Samsung products